Caladenia rosea, also known as pink primrose orchid, is a plant in the orchid family Orchidaceae and is endemic to relatively inaccessible, high lateritic plateaux in a high rainfall area in south-western Western Australia. It is a terrestrial orchid with a single hairy leaf and up to three pink flowers on a thin, sparsely-hairy stem. It is similar to Caladenia flava but is distinguished by the perianth being pink to dark pink with prominent red striping and spotting on the dorsal sepal and lateral petals. 
Caladenia rosea mimics Hypocalymma robustum (Myrtaceae) in terms of flowering time, colour and scent.

Description
The sepals and petals are spreading, pink throughout with various amounts of deeper pink dots and stripes. The lateral sepals spathulate to ovate-lanceolate and petals ovate usually with a single darker pink stripe. Column is curved over the raised central plate, yellow with prominent white lateral wings.

Taxonomy and naming
The first formal description of this orchid was by Kingsley Dixon and Maarten Christenhusz in 2018, but the species was initially not adopted by Florabase. 
It was confused for the hybrid C. × spectabilis, which does occur in the are, but has orange flowers and occurs in very small numbers, whereas this species is fertile and is known from larger populations.

Distribution and habitat
Caladenia rosea grows sympatrically with Caladenia lateritica in shallow lateritic regolith that overlays massive bauxite. The open jarrah (Eucalyptus marginata) and marri (Corymbia calophylla) woodland has an understory of
Banksia sessilis, Conostylis setosa, Hypocalymma robustum, Orthosanthus laxus, Xanthorrhoea preissii, Phyllanthus calycinus and Stylidium species.

Ecology
Caladenia rosea is putatively mimicking flowers of the Swan River myrtle (Hypocalymma robustum), which has a similar colour and scent. We assume that this orchid is pollinated by the same insects as Hypocalymma robustum (probably native bees). As for Caladenia lateritica, C. rosea is restricted to the shallow soils overlaying massive bauxite in a confined, high rainfall region that is now subject to strip mining for bauxite. The species is therefore threatened with extinction.

References

rosea
Plants described in 2018
Endemic orchids of Australia
Orchids of Western Australia